Xanthorhoe biriviata, the balsam carpet, is a moth of the genus Xanthorhoe in the family Geometridae.  The species was first described by Moritz Balthasar Borkhausen in 1794. It is found "widespread in Europe and temperate Asia. In southern Europe the distribution is restricted only locally to the mountain(s)."

References

External links

Fauna Europaea
Lepiforum e.V.

Xanthorhoe
Moths of Asia
Moths of Europe
Taxa named by Moritz Balthasar Borkhausen